The Belarusian National Badminton Championships is a tournament organized to crown the best badminton players in Belarus. They are held since the season 1992. There is not any international tournament in Belarus.

Past winners

Junior champions

References
Badminton Europe - Belarus
Belarus - Belarusian Badminton Federation

Badminton in Belarus
National badminton championships
Sports competitions in Belarus
Recurring sporting events established in 1992
Badminton